This is a timeline documenting events of Jazz in the year 1942.

Events

 August
 The American Federation of Musicians president James C. Petrillo initiated a ban on recording, in hopes of coercing record companies into returning part of their profits to the union to be used for special concerts and projects. This forced the record companies to focus on recording singers and singing groups and reissuing previously recorded material.

 October 
 Sarah Vaughan was discovered at the Apollo Theater in Harlem after having won first prize at Amateur Night.
 18  – Louis Armstrong was married to a Cotton Club dancer named Lucille Wilson. They remained married until his death.

Standards

Deaths 

 January
 1 – Jaroslav Ježek, Czechoslovakian composer, pianist and conductor (born 1906).
 12 – Willie Cornish, American trombonist (born 1875).

 March
 1 – Leo Adde, American drummer (born 1904).
 2 – Charlie Christian, American guitarist (born 1916).

  June
 2 – Bunny Berigan, American trumpeter (born 1908).

 July 
 30 – Jimmy Blanton, American upright bassist (born 1918).

Births

 January
 4 – John McLaughlin, English guitarist.
 7 – Jocelyne Jocya, American singer and songwriter (died 2003).
 8
 Bill Goodwin, American drummer.
 Jon Lucien, American vocalist (died 2007).
 19 – Nara Leão, Brazilian singer (died 1989).
 25
 Art Murphy, American pianist and composer (died 2006).
 Graeme Lyall, Australian saxophonist, composer and arranger.
 27 – Maki Asakawa, Japanese singer, lyricist, and composer (died 2010).

 February
 5 – Keith Ingham, English pianist.
 8 – James Blood Ulmer, American guitarist and singer.
 12 – Lionel Grigson, British pianist and trumpeter (died 1994).
 26 – Yōsuke Yamashita, Japanese pianist, composer and writer.

 March
 3
 Lyman Woodard, American organist (died 2009).
 Teruo Nakamura, Japanese bassist.
 4 – Dave Matthews, American keyboardist.
 5 – Dave Green, English upright bassist.
 6
 Charles Tolliver, American trumpeter and composer.
 Flora Purim, Brazilian singer.
 Robin Kenyatta, American alto saxophonist (died 2004).
 21 – Amina Claudine Myers, American pianist, organist, vocalist, and composer.
 25 – Aretha Franklin, American singer and songwriter (died 2018).

 April
 2 – Leon Russell, American musician and songwriter (died 2016).
 13 – Rusty Jones, American drummer (died 2015).
 17
 Buster Williams, American bassist.
 Han Bennink, Dutch drummer and multi-instrumentalist.
 21 – Alan Skidmore, English tenor saxophonist.
 29 – Sammy Rimington, English reedist.

 May
 6 – David Friesen, American bassist.
 13 – Jim Douglas, Scottish guitarist.
 20 – Dan Jacobs, American trumpeter and flugelhornist.
 23 – Randolph Colville, Scottish clarinettist and saxophonist (died 2004).
 26 – Geoff Bull, Australian trumpeter and bandleader.

 June
 3 – Curtis Mayfield, American singer-songwriter, guitarist, record producer (died 1999).
 14 – Peter Lemer, English pianist and keyboarder, Spontaneous Music Ensemble.
 17 – Torgrim Sollid, Norwegian trumpeter and drummer.
 21 – Ditlef Eckhoff, Norwegian trumpeter.
 25 – Joe Chambers, American drummer, pianist, vibraphonist, and composer.

 July
 2 – Mike Abene, American pianist.
 3 – Lonnie Smith, American Hammond B3 organist
 11 – Tomasz Stanko, Polish trumpeter and composer (died 2018).
 12 – Richard Stoltzman, American clarinetist.

 August
 2 – Carl Saunders, American trumpeter, composer and educator.
 6 – Byard Lancaster, American saxophonist and flutist (died 2012).
 9 – Jack DeJohnette, American drummer, pianist, and composer.
 16 – Marc Moulin, Belgian musician and journalist (died 2008).
 23
 Letta Mbulu, South African singer.
 Walter Payton, American bassist and sousaphonist (died 2010).
 25
 Michel Donato, Canadian upright bassist and composer.
 Terje Fjærn, Norwegian orchestra conductor ("La det swinge") (died 2016).

 September
 6
 Andrew White, American saxophonist.
 Dave Bargeron, American trombonist and tubist.
 12 – Jane Getz, American pianist.
 14 – Oliver Lake, American saxophonist and composer.
 22 – Marlena Shaw, American singer.
 23 – Jeremy Steig, American flautist (died 2016).
 25 – John Taylor, British pianist (died 2015).
 28 – Tim Maia, Brazilian musician and songwriter (died 1998).
 29 – Jean-Luc Ponty, French violinist and composer.
 30 – Frankie Lymon, American singer (died 1968).

 October
 1
 Charles Braugham, American drummer.
 Wendell Harrison, American clarinetist, tenor saxophonist.
 5 – Donald Ayler, American trumpeter (died 2007).
 10 – Cecil Bridgewater, American trumpeter.
 25 – Terumasa Hino, Japanese trumpeter.
 26 – Ranee Lee, American vocalist.
 27 – Philip Catherine, Belgian guitarist and composer.

 November
 9 – Bill Elgart, American drummer.
 10 – Zdzisław Piernik, Polish tubist.
 23 – Jiří Stivín, Czech flautist and composer.

 December
 9 – Jimmy Owens, American trumpeter, composer, arranger, and educator.
 19 – Cornell Dupree, American guitarist (died 2011).
 26 – Doug Hammond, American drummer, composer, and poet.
 31 – Andy Summers, English guitarist, composer, and photographer.

 Unknown date
 Carlton Kitto, Indian guitarist (died 2016).
 Pocho Lapouble, Argentine drummer, composer and arranger (died 2009).
 Richard Badendyck, Norwegian singer and pianist.
 Steve Brown, American guitarist, composer, arranger, and educator.

See also
 1940s in jazz
 List of years in jazz
 1942 in music

References

Bibliography

External links 
 History Of Jazz Timeline: 1942 at All About Jazz

Jazz
Jazz by year